Lars Rickard "Lasse" Eriksson (born 21 September 1965) is a Swedish former professional footballer who played as a goalkeeper. He represented Hammarby IF, IFK Norrköping, Charleroi, and FC Porto during a career that spanned between 1986 and 2001. A full international between 1988 and 1995, he won 17 caps for the Sweden national team and was a part of Sweden's 1990 FIFA World Cup, UEFA Euro 1992, and 1994 FIFA World Cup squads. He also represented the Sweden Olympic team at the 1988 Summer Olympics.

Early life
Eriksson grew up in Haninge in Stockholm County where he started playing football at the local club Vendelsö IK. He moved to Hammarby IF as a youngster in 1977 at age 12. During his early teens, he lived abroad for a few years together with his family before returning to Hammarby and their B-team.

Club career

Hammarby IF
Eriksson made his professional debut for Hammarby in Allsvenskan in 1986, aged 21, replacing Mark White as starter halfway through the season. He made his debut in a 5-1 win against Kalmar FF with Hammarby only conceding 1,2 goals per game during the remainder of the season with Eriksson between the posts.

He stayed as the club's first choice goalkeeper for another two seasons, before leaving in 1988 when Hammarby got relegated to Division 1.

IFK Norrköping
Before the start of the 1989 season he signed with IFK Norrköping in Allsvenskan. The team finished in second place during the regular series the same year, but won the subsequent play-off, ultimately being crowned Swedish champions. Eriksson saved two penalties in the third and decisive game of the finals against Malmö FF on 15 November 1989.

In 1990, he was awarded "player of the year" by the Östergötland Football Association.

He would later play another five seasons at Norrköping, with the team consequently finishing in the top half of the table. Lars Eriksson featured in every competitive game for the club during this tenure. He also won two Swedish Cup-titles with "Peking", in 1990–91 and 1993–94.

Charleroi
Halfway through the 1994–95 season, he moved abroad for the first time in his career, at age 29. He signed for the Belgian Pro League league club Charleroi S.C. in November 1994. However, he would only feature in 9 competitive games for the side before moving to Portuguese club FC Porto in March 1995.

FC Porto 
At Porto, he was crowned Liga NOS champion during three consecutive seasons, in 1995–96, 1996–97 and 1997–98. However, he was used sparingly and only featured in 13 competitive games. During his tenure at the club he mostly served as a backup for Vítor Baía, Andrzej Woźniak, Silvino Louro and Henrique Hilário.

Return to Hammarby IF
During the 1998 Allsvenskan midseason he returned to his native country, signing a deal with his first professional club Hammarby in July the same year. After returning with an injury, Eriksson's comeback would however be postponed up until the season of 1999, when he also was appointed captain of the team.

In 2001, he won Allsvenskan for the second time in his career. Hammarby secured the title from a victory against Örgryte IS on 21 October, on the second to last match day of the campaign. As he already had decided on retiring after the season, Eriksson was praised by the fans at the home ground Söderstadion together with then manager Sören Cratz, who also were to leave the club.

After the season, he was voted goalkeeper of the year at the annual Fotbollsgalan, hosted by the Swedish Football Association. In 2004, Eriksson was voted as Hammarby's sixth biggest profile throughout the history of the club.

International career
Lars Eriksson debuted for the Swedish under-21 national team against England in 1986. He would later win 15 caps for the team, making his final appearances during the 1990 UEFA European Under-21 Championship.

He made his debut for the senior national team on January 12 in 1988, starting in a 4-1 win against East Germany in Maspalomas. In total he would play 17 matches for his country up until 1995, often being used as bench cover for Thomas Ravelli. He took part in several major tournaments, the 1988 Summer Olympics, 1990 FIFA World Cup, 1994 FIFA World Cup and Euro 1992.

Style of play
Eriksson was known a goalkeeper with good reactions and a strong line play. He was also noticed for his frequent ability of saving penalties.

Managerial career
After his playing career ended, he was assigned the role as a goalkeeping coach at Hammarby in 2002. He would remain at this position up until 2007, when he was promoted to director of football at said club. He was however fired two years later, in May 2009, due to lack of results and financial reasons.

In late 2009, he joined the staff of the newly-appointed Swedish national team manager Erik Hamrén as the goalkeeping coach. He was a part of the personnel during the Euro 2012 and Euro 2016, mainly working with the Swedish starter Andreas Isaksson, before leaving his post after the latter tournament.

Career statistics

International

Honours 
IFK Norrköping
 Swedish Champion: 1989
 Svenska Cupen: 1990–91, 1993–94
FC Porto
 Primeira Liga: 1994–95, 1995–96, 1996–97, 1997–98
 Taça de Portugal: 1997–98
Hammarby
 Allsvenskan: 2001
Sweden
 FIFA World Cup third place: 1994

References

External links 
 

1965 births
Living people
Swedish footballers
Sweden international footballers
Sweden under-21 international footballers
Allsvenskan players
Belgian Pro League players
Primeira Liga players
FC Porto players
IFK Norrköping players
R. Charleroi S.C. players
Hammarby Fotboll players
1990 FIFA World Cup players
1994 FIFA World Cup players
UEFA Euro 1992 players
Association football goalkeepers
Olympic footballers of Sweden
Footballers at the 1988 Summer Olympics
Expatriate footballers in Belgium
Expatriate footballers in Portugal
Hammarby Fotboll directors and chairmen
Footballers from Stockholm
Swedish expatriate sportspeople in Portugal